The 1997–98 FIS Cross-Country World Cup  was the 17th official World Cup season in cross-country skiing for men and women. The season began in Beitostølen, Norway, on 22 November 1997 and finished at Holmenkollen, Oslo, Norway, on 14 March 1998. Thomas Alsgaard of Norway won the overall men's cup, and Larisa Lazutina of Russia won the women's.

Calendar

Men

Women

Men's team

Women's team

Men's standings

Overall

Long Distance

Sprint

Women's standings

Overall

Long Distance

Sprint

Achievements
Victories in this World Cup (all-time number of victories as of 1997/98 season in parentheses)

Men
 , 4 (41) first places
 , 3 (4) first places
 , 1 (30) first place
 , 1 (4) first place
 , 1 (1) first place
 , 1 (1) first place
 , 1 (9) first place

Women
 , 4 (12) first places
 , 3 (3) first places
 , 2 (17) first places
 , 1 (45) first place
 , 1 (2) first place
 , 1 (1) first place

References

FIS Cross-Country World Cup seasons
World Cup 1997-98
World Cup 1997-98